Benalto/Hillman's Farm Aerodrome  is a registered aerodrome located  south of Benalto, Alberta, Canada.

References

External links
Page about this airport on COPA's Places to Fly airport directory

Registered aerodromes in Alberta
Red Deer County